George Wilson Becton was the "first of the colorful cult leaders in Harlem." He began charismatic preaching in about 1930, after the decline of Marcus Garvey, and continued until he was mysteriously murdered in 1933.

Becton's sermons were formal and presented in a dignified setting, with orchestral music and liveried pages. He was kidnapped and shot to death on May 25, 1933. He died without describing his attackers or explaining why anybody might have wanted him killed.

Claude McKay wrote about Becton in his book Harlem, Negro Metropolis.

References 

1933 deaths
1933 murders in the United States
African-American Christian clergy
American Christian clergy
Kidnapped American people
Male murder victims
Murdered African-American people
Deaths by firearm in New York (state)
People murdered in New York (state)
Year of birth missing